Juan Esteban Arango Carvajal (born 9 October 1986 in Colombia) is a Colombian road and track cyclist.

At the 2012 Summer Olympics, he competed in the Men's team pursuit for the national team, and in the men's omnium.

Major results

Road

2007
 1st  Road race, National Under-23 Road Championships
2010
 6th Time trial, National Road Championships
2011
 5th Road race, Pan American Games
2012
 1st Stage 8 Vuelta Mexico Telmex
2015
 1st  Sprints classification Tour de San Luis
2017
 1st Stage 3 Tour of Ankara
 8th Winston-Salem Cycling Classic
2018
 10th Road race, Central American and Caribbean Games

Track

2008
 2008–09 UCI Track Cycling World Cup Classics, Cali
2nd  Madison (with Carlos Urán)
3rd  Team pursuit (with Arles Castro, Edwin Ávila and Alexander González)
 3rd  Scratch, 2007–08 UCI Track Cycling World Cup Classics, Copenhagen
2009
 2009–10 UCI Track Cycling World Cup Classics, Cali
1st  Team pursuit (with Edwin Ávila, Weimar Roldán and Arles Castro)
2nd  Individual pursuit
2010
 Central American and Caribbean Games
1st  Individual pursuit
1st  Omnium
1st  Madison (with Weimar Roldán)
1st  Team pursuit (with Edwin Ávila, Alex Castro and Weimar Roldán)
 2nd  Scratch, UCI Track Cycling World Championships
 2010–11 UCI Track Cycling World Cup Classics, Cali
2nd  Team pursuit (with Edwin Ávila, Weimar Roldán and Arles Castro)
2nd  Omnium
2011
 Pan American Games
1st  Omnium
1st  Team pursuit (with Edwin Ávila, Weimar Roldán and Arles Castro)
 2011–12 UCI Track Cycling World Cup, Cali
1st  Omnium
1st  Madison (with Weimar Roldán)
2012
 1st  Omnium, 2011–12 UCI Track Cycling World Cup, London
 1st  Team pursuit, 2012–13 UCI Track Cycling World Cup, Cali (with Weimar Roldán, Arles Castro and Edwin Ávila)
2013
 Bolivarian Games
1st  Individual pursuit
1st  Points race
1st  Madison (with Fernando Gaviria)
1st  Team pursuit (with Juan Sebastián Molano, Arles Castro and Jordan Parra)
2015
 Marymoor Grand Prix
1st Keirin
1st Omnium
Track record, Men's Flying Lap (400m)
2017
 Bolivarian Games
1st  Omnium
1st  Team pursuit

References

External links

ARANGO CARVAJAL Juan Esteban at cqranking.com

Colombian male cyclists
Living people
Olympic cyclists of Colombia
Cyclists at the 2012 Summer Olympics
Colombian track cyclists
1986 births
Sportspeople from Medellín
Central American and Caribbean Games gold medalists for Colombia
South American Games gold medalists for Colombia
South American Games medalists in cycling
Competitors at the 2010 South American Games
Competitors at the 2010 Central American and Caribbean Games
Cyclists at the 2015 Pan American Games
Cyclists at the 2019 Pan American Games
Pan American Games medalists in cycling
Pan American Games gold medalists for Colombia
Pan American Games silver medalists for Colombia
Pan American Games bronze medalists for Colombia
Central American and Caribbean Games medalists in cycling
Medalists at the 2011 Pan American Games
Medalists at the 2015 Pan American Games
Medalists at the 2019 Pan American Games
21st-century Colombian people
Competitors at the 2014 Central American and Caribbean Games
Competitors at the 2018 Central American and Caribbean Games